The Tarth Water is a river in Peebleshire, in the Scottish Borders. It forms part of the River Tweed system. The river with a total length of 7.1 miles, rises on Mendick Hill, a Marilyn, and flows past the villages of Dolphinton and Blyth Bridge before converging at Drochil Castle  with the Lyne Water, a tributary of the Tweed.

See also
List of rivers of Scotland
List of places in the Scottish Borders
List of places in Scotland

Rivers of the Scottish Borders
Tributaries of the River Tweed
2Tarth